Macristis geminipunctalis is a species of litter moth in the family Erebidae. It is found in North America.

The MONA or Hodges number for Macristis geminipunctalis is 8402.1.

References

Further reading

 
 
 

Herminiinae
Articles created by Qbugbot
Moths described in 1916